Paul Götz (1883–1962) was a German astronomer and discoverer of 20 minor planets between 1903 and 1905.

He did his Ph.D. dissertation in 1907 at the Landessternwarte Heidelberg-Königstuhl (Königstuhl Observatory, near Heidelberg) at the University of Heidelberg.

At the time, the observatory at Heidelberg was a center for asteroid discovery under the direction of Max Wolf, and several past and future fellow Ph.D.s (Raymond Smith Dugan, Joseph Helffrich, Franz Kaiser, Karl Reinmuth, Emil Ernst, Alfred Bohrmann) made a number of asteroid discoveries. Thus the asteroid discoveries by "P. Gotz" at Heidelberg in this time frame are undoubtedly identified with the Paul Götz who got his Ph.D. in 1907.

The main-belt asteroid 2278 Götz was named in his memory in 1991.

References 
 

Discoverers of asteroids

20th-century German astronomers